Lyudmila Ivanovna Ivanova (22 June 1933 – 7 October 2016) was a Soviet and Russian film and stage actress, People's Artist of the RSFSR (1989). She was awarded the Order of Honour and the Order of Friendship. She composed many songs for the guitar.

Biography
Ivanova was born on 22 June 1933 in Moscow. She graduated from the Moscow Art Theatre School in 1955 and was accepted into the troupe of the Moscow mobile drama. In 1957, Ivanova entered the Sovremennik Theatre.

Author of many bard songs, she performed in concerts, with Anna German, Sergey Nikitin and Tatyana Nikitina. Artistic director and chief director of the Children's Musical Theater  Impromptu. On 18 March 2014 accepted as a member of the Union of Writers of Russia.

On 7 October 2016, Ivanova died at a Moscow hospital, aged 83. The cause of death was not disclosed.

Filmography
 1958 – Volunteers
 1963 – Large and Small
 1965 – Build Bridges
 1965 – The Sleeping Lion
 1966 – Nasty Аnecdote
 1968 – Newcomer
 1970 – Deniska's Stories
 1972 – Train Stop — Two Minutes
 1973 – Looking For a Мan
 1974 – Remember Your Name
 1975 – Option Omega
 1975 – Between Heaven and Earth
 1976 – Days Surgeon of Mishkin
 1976 – The Legend of Thiele
 1977 – Office Romance
 1977 – Vesnuhin's Fantasy
 1978 – Vanity of Vanities
 1980 – Ladies Invite Gentlemen
 1982 – Flights in Dreams and Reality
 1983 – Vacation of Petrov and Vasechkin, Usual and Incredible
 1984 – A Small Favor
 1984 – Chance
 1984 – Dr. Aibolit
 1985 – The Most Charming and Attractive
 1986 – Plumbum, or The Dangerous Game
 1987 – The Arrival of the Moon
 1991 – Spotted Dog Running at the Edge of the Sea
 1991 – Promised Heaven
 1992 – New Odeon
 1993 – American Grandfather
 1993 – About Businessman Foma
 1994 – The Master and Margarita
 1995 – Moscow Нolidays
2000 – The Envy of Gods
 2010 – Moscow, I love you!

Popular songs
 Maybe
 Spring tango
 What is love
 Letter soldier
 Tarusa-gorodok

Family
 Father – Ivan Ivanov (1905-1952), Soviet polar explorer, geographer profession 
 Mother – Faina Ivanova (1908-1969)
 Husband – Valery Milyaev (1937-2011), singer, writer, teacher, doctor of physical and mathematical sciences.
 Two sons: Ivan Milyaev, Honored Artist of RussiaAlexander (1970-2010)

Awards
 Order of  Honor (6 June 2001) – for many years of fruitful activity in the field of art and culture, and a great contribution to strengthening friendship and cooperation between nations
 Order of Friendship (21 April 2009) – for her work in the development of national culture and art, and many years of fruitful activity

References

External links

Russian film actresses
Actresses from Moscow
1933 births
2016 deaths
Burials at Pyatnitskoye Cemetery
Soviet film actresses
Recipients of the Order of Honour (Russia)
People's Artists of the RSFSR
Honored Artists of the RSFSR
Moscow Art Theatre School alumni
20th-century Russian women